Tissues that have been preserved with formaldehyde, a highly reactive compound, contain a variety of chemical modifications that can reduce the detectability of proteins in biomedical procedures such as immunohistochemistry. Antigen retrieval is an approach to reducing or eliminating these chemical modifications. The two primary methods of antigen retrieval are heat-mediated epitope retrieval (HIER) and proteolytic induced epitope retrieval (PIER).

Protease-induced epitope retrieval (PIER) 
In PIER, enzymes including Proteinase K, Trypsin, and Pepsin have been used to restore antibody binding to its epitope. The purported mechanism of action is cleavage of peptides masking the epitope, restoring antigenicity.

Disadvantages of PIER include a low success rate for restoring immunoreactivity, and the potential destruction of tissue morphology and the antigen of interest.

Heat-induced epitope retrieval (HIER) 
HIER is believed to reverse some cross-links, and allows for restoration of secondary of tertiary structure of the epitope. The protocol requires optimization for each tissue, fixation method, and antigen to be studied.

In general, HIER has a much higher success rate than PIER. HIER can be performed with microwave ovens, pressure cookers, vegetable steamers, autoclaves, or water baths. HIER is time, temperature, buffer, and pH-sensitive.

Room Temperature Epitope Retrieval (RTER) 
RTER involves reversal of cross-links using acids such as hydrochloric acid (pH 1) or formic acid (pH 2).

Frozen Section Epitope Retrieval (FSER) 
FSER refers to two antigen retrieval methods designed specifically for aldehyde-fixed cryostat frozen tissue sections or cultured cells; the SDS and Heating En Bloc methods.

SDS method requires a brief 5 minute pretreatment using 1% SDS and can produce an increase in staining intensity by IHC as well as immunofluorescence.

Heating En Bloc takes tissue blocks fixated in paraformaldehyde, heats them in retrieval solutions, and then freezes them using dry ice.  Heating is already used in AR and has been proven to be widely effective, but previous heating methods have been shown to kill frozen sections. This method proved to enhance immunoreactivity for a wide range of antigens and lower the background staining in some cases.

References

Chemical reactions
Immunohistochemistry
Histology